Alessandro Marchettí (1884 – 5 December 1966) was an Italian engineer and airplane designer. Marchetti was born in Sesto Calende, Italy, and died in Rome. He was best known for having created the Savoia-Marchetti SM.79, a World War II bomber aircraft.

See also
 Savoia-Marchetti

References 
 scheda del S.55 X Some Italian website
 scheda del S.M.79 Some Italian website

1884 births
1966 deaths
Italian aerospace engineers
SIAI-Marchetti